(1894–1978) was a Mexican botanist of Japanese origin. In scholarly works his name is generally romanised as "Eizi Matuda" following the "Kunrei" system.

Biography
Matuda and his wife, Miduho Kaneko de Matuda, were naturalized Mexican citizens and had five Mexico-born children.

Legacy
In 1956, a species of cactus native to Mexico was named in his honor, the Mammillaria matudae. The genus Matudina in the sunflower family is also named in his honor.

Two species and one subspecies of reptiles are named in his honor: Abronia matudai (Matuda's arboreal alligator lizard), Anolis matudai (Matuda's anole), and Pseudelaphe flavirufa matudai (Matuda's ratsnake). Two frogs are named after him: Craugastor matudai (Matuda's robber frog) and Plectrohyla matudai (Matuda's spikethumb frog).

References

1894 births
1978 deaths
Mexican scientists
Japanese emigrants to Mexico
Mexican people of Japanese descent
Naturalized citizens of Mexico